Princess Longji is a Chinese goddess and character in the classic Chinese novel, Fengshen Yanyi. She is the daughter of the Emperor of the Heaven, Haotian Shangdi, identified with the Jade Emperor, and his wife Yaochi Jinmu, identified with the Queen Mother of the West.

Legend
 
In Fengshen Yanyi, Princess Longji is a celestial princess who can control water and rain. While living in the celestial temple, she was demoted to the status of a mortal and exiled to earth for missing the Peaches of Immortality before the Peach Festival. While on Earth, she became involved in the conflict between the Shang and Zhou armies. At first helping Yang Jian defeat the Earth Traveler Sun, and then repelling the Fire God Luo Xuan, who almost burned down most of West Qi. She hopes that one day, her immortal status will be restored and she will be allowed to return to the heavenly court, owing to her willingness and effort to help those in need. Jiang Ziya welcomed Princess Longji into his army after hearing of her accomplishments and granted her her own residence in West Qi. 

Princess Longji married the captured Shang general, Hong Jin, to turn him into an ally for the Zhou army. She accompanied her husband into many battles against the Shang Dynasty before both were eventually killed by the Jinling Shengmu. After her death, Jiang Ziya deified Longji as the Goddess of the Red Phoenix Star.

References

Chinese goddesses
Deities in Taoism
Investiture of the Gods characters